KFFV (channel 44) is a television station in Seattle, Washington, United States, airing programming from MeTV. It is owned and operated by Weigel Broadcasting alongside Bellingham-licensed Heroes & Icons station KVOS-TV, channel 12 (which KFFV simulcasts on its third digital subchannel). Both stations share studios on Third Avenue South in Seattle, while KFFV's transmitter is located on Capitol Hill east of downtown.

History

Early years

The former KHCV call letters were assigned by the Federal Communications Commission (FCC) with a construction permit on October 2, 1989. The station signed on the air on January 1, 1999, on Channel 45 after many permit extensions.

Channel launches
During the week of August 11, 2006, KHCV started carrying Azteca América on its analog channel 45 and on its digital channel 44.2.

On December 20, 2006, Navarre's FUNimation Entertainment announced that the FUNimation channel would be broadcast on KHCV 44.3.

On March 1, 2007, KHCV started broadcasting content from GNF Entertainment Network on its digital subchannels 44.3 and 44.4. 44.3 carried GNF "Game & Music" and 44.4 carried GNF "Movie".

Network changes
The analog broadcast (UHF 45) had been exclusively Azteca América, while the Comcast broadcast of this channel (Channel 15) is Jewelry TV. On September 10, 2007, analog UHF channel 45 carried the same Jewelry TV content as digital UHF channel 44.1 and Comcast channel 15.

On October 15, 2007, programming from AAT Television started broadcasting on digital channel 44.3.

On April 19, 2008, America One content on channel 44.4 was replaced by Sportsman Channel; it was later replaced with MBC-D, a Korean television channel.

On November 13, 2008, KHCV filed for a request for silent state for its analog signal.

On September 28, 2009, KHCV became KPST. On December 22, 2009, KPST went silent. The station was evicted from its studios and its STL link couldn't be operated from the new location. KPST hoped to have the station up and running within a few weeks. The station resumed broadcasting on February 4, 2010. During that time, KPST aired only infomercials on its main channel, 24 hours a day.

As KFFV-TV

The call letters were changed to KFFV on November 15, 2010. The station was purchased at bankruptcy auction by OTA Broadcasting on June 30, 2011; the sale was completed on October 12.

In January 2013, WeatherNation was added to channel 44.5. It was later replaced by Cozi TV.

On March 12, 2015, KFFV's sister station KVOS-TV's main channel, MeTV, had "soft-launched" to sub-channel 44.6.

Weigel Broadcasting agreed to acquire KFFV and KVOS-TV, along with KAXT-CD and KTLN-TV in San Francisco, in a $23.2 million deal on October 18, 2017. The sale was closed on January 15, 2018, with KFFV and KVOS now under Weigel ownership.

On January 17, 2018, Weigel terminated KFFV's carriage agreements with the networks aired under OTA ownership, and switched to a near-duplication of KVOS' services, with MeTV replacing Evine on channel 44.1, Movies! replacing Azteca América on 44.2, and AAT replaced by H&I on 44.3 (AAT moved to KUSE-LD4). Cozi returned to Seattle on two other Seattle area stations: low-powered TV station KYMU-LD in 2019 and on KIRO-TV's third digital subchannel in 2020.  Azteca and KBS World have yet to find new channel locations in Seattle.

Technical information

Subchannels
The station's digital signal is multiplexed:

References

External links 

FFV
MeTV affiliates
Movies! affiliates
Heroes & Icons affiliates
Decades (TV network) affiliates
Story Television affiliates
OnTV4U affiliates
Television channels and stations established in 1999
1999 establishments in Washington (state)
Weigel Broadcasting